Kowloon station may refer to:
 Kowloon Station (constituency), a constituency in Yau Tsim Mong District
 Kowloon station (MTR), a station of the MTR rapid transit system in Hong Kong
 Kowloon railway station (KCR), the former southern terminus of the Kowloon–Canton Railway, demolished in 1978
 Hung Hom station, originally named Kowloon, an MTR station with intercity and rapid transit services which replaced the KCR station in 1975

See also 
 Hong Kong West Kowloon railway station, a high-speed rail station in Hong Kong
 Guryong station, a station in Seoul with the same Chinese characters